Darnell "Dr. Dunk" Hillman (born August 29, 1949) is a former professional basketball player.

Hillman graduated from Hiram W. Johnson High School.

The 6 ft 9 in (2.06 m) forward played college basketball at San Jose State University. Hillman was selected in the first round of the 1971 NBA draft (the 8th pick overall) by the Golden State Warriors, but opted instead to play for the Indiana Pacers of the American Basketball Association.  While at San Jose State Hillman also branched out into track and field. In the high jump he cleared 6'11 1/2" which still ranks 10th on San Jose's all-time list.

Hillman played six seasons for the Pacers, who joined the National Basketball Association (NBA) with the ABA–NBA merger in June 1976. Hillman earned a reputation for his stylish slam dunks and oversized afro hairstyle. He would even be named the winner of the NBA's Slam Dunk Contest in the 1976–77 season, which was a precursor to the event that's known today, although he wouldn't be give an official trophy for it until March 8, 2017 In the final of that contest, which took place at halftime of Game 5 of the 1977 NBA Finals Hillman defeated Larry McNeill of the Golden State Warriors.  At the time of the final, Hillman's rights had been traded to the New York Nets, but he had not yet signed a contract. Since he was not officially a member of any NBA team, instead of wearing a jersey, he competed in a plain white tank top. Then for the post-competition interview, Hillman donned a shirt with the words "Bottle Shoppe" – the name of an Indianapolis liquor store, which is still in existence, and was the sponsor of a city parks softball league team for which Hillman played left field (and the only team he was a member of at the time).

Hillman later played with the New Jersey Nets, Denver Nuggets, Kansas City Kings, and Golden State Warriors in the NBA, and he ended his career in 1980 with combined NBA/ABA totals of 6,666 points and 5,187 rebounds during the regular season, and 7,339 points and 5,809 rebounds including the post-season.

Hillman also played for the United States men's national basketball team at the 1970 FIBA World Championship.

Hillman was once asked by a reporter if it was true he could jump high enough to grab a quarter off the top of the backboard. Hillman responded, "Put a $100 bill up there and see." The reporter, who had heard the stories of Hillman picking quarters off the top of backboards, turned down the offer.

At the 1997 ABA reunion, Hillman won the "Biggest ABA Afro" Award.

Currently, Hillman serves as Associate Director of Camps, Clinics & Alumni Relations for the Indiana Pacers.

On February 4, 2012, Hillman's #45 was retired by San Jose State University. Hillman joins Ricky Berry (#34) and Olivier Saint-Jean (#3) as the only Spartans to have their jerseys retired.

References

External links
Career statistics
RememberTheABA.com Darnell Hillman page

1949 births
Living people
African-American basketball players
American men's basketball players
Basketball players from Sacramento, California
Denver Nuggets players
Golden State Warriors draft picks
Golden State Warriors players
Indiana Pacers players
Kansas City Kings players
New Jersey Nets players
Power forwards (basketball)
San Jose State Spartans men's basketball players
United States men's national basketball team players
21st-century African-American people
20th-century African-American sportspeople
1970 FIBA World Championship players